Walter White most often refers to:

 Walter White (Breaking Bad), character in the television series Breaking Bad
 Walter White (NAACP) (1893–1955), American leader of the NAACP

Walter White may also refer to:

Fictional characters 
 Walter White Jr., character in the television series Breaking Bad

In sports
 Walter White (American football) (1951–2019), American football player for the Kansas City Chiefs
 Walter White (Scottish footballer) (1882–1950), Scottish footballer for Bolton Wanderers, Everton, Fulham and Scotland
 Walter White (English footballer) (1864–?), English footballer for Wolverhampton Wanderers
 Walter White (boxer) (1894–1968), British Olympic boxer

In government or electoral politics
 Walter L. White (1919–2007), American politician in the Ohio Senate
 Walter W. White (1862–1952), Canadian politician in the Legislative Assembly of New Brunswick
 Walter White (Tennessee politician) (1881–1951), American politician in the Tennessee General Assembly

Other people
 Walter S. White (1917–2002), American architect and industrial designer